The 1977 Pakistan uprising, also known as the Pakistani Revolution of 1977, was a long act of growing street protests and a long series of countrywide demonstrations against the results of the 1977 Pakistani general election and against prime minister Zulfikar Ali Bhutto in Pakistan. The protests first erupted against prime minister Zulfikar Ali Bhutto and the results of the 1977 Pakistani general election. After a wave of popular uprisings and massive demonstrations, the government ordered tanks and the military to be deployed to crack down on demonstrators. Anti-Bhutto protests continued for 2 months without any violence until June, when 50 were killed in clashes and intense violence at protests. The increasingly violent street demonstrations were characterised by riots and street protests while police clashed and ordered a crackdown on the demonstrators, using Live ammunition, Pellet (air gun) and Rubber bullets to disperse protesters while protests consisted of Looting, Arson attacks and Violence. 100+ protesters were killed in Strike actions and massive labour unrest during the bloody crisis and the uprising ultimately led to the Operation Fair Play.

See also
 1968 movement in Pakistan

References

Protests in Pakistan
1977 protests
Protests against results of elections
1977 in Pakistan